Peonidin-3-O-glucoside is anthocyanin. It is found in fruits and berries, in red Vitis vinifera grapes and red wine, in red onions and in purple corn. It is dark red to purple in colour.

See also 
 Phenolic compounds in wine

References 

O-methylated anthocyanins